Byrrhidae, the pill beetles, is a family of beetles in the superfamily Byrrhoidea. They are generally found in damp habitats within cooler-high latitude regions of both hemispheres. Most byrrhids feed on moss, lichens and algae, though some species feed on vascular plants. The oldest undoubted record of the family is Lidryops from the earliest Late Cretaceous Charentese amber of France, with other less certain records going back to the Middle Jurassic, but these possibly belong to Byrrhoidea. There around 500 extant species in 40 genera.

Taxonomy 
There are about 450 species in this family.

Genera include:
Amphycyrta
Arctobyrrhus   
Byrrhus
Chaetophora  
Curimopsis  
Cytilus 
Eusomalia 
Exomella
Lioligus   
Lioon
Listemus   
Morychus
Porcinolus
Sierraclava
Simplocaria

References

External links

 
Polyphaga families